Pope Paul VI declared 85 individuals venerable, based on the recognition of their heroic virtues from 1963 to 1978.

1964

February 13, 1964
Ludovico of Casoria (1814–1885)
Mary of the Divine Heart (1863–1899)

April 8, 1964
Maria Fortunata Viti (1827–1922)

1965

July 15, 1965
Giuseppe Benedetto Dusmet (1818–1894)
Maria Therese von Wüllenweber (1833–1907)
Charbel Makhluf (1828–1898)

November 23, 1965
Bruno Lanteri (1759–1830)

1966

December 15, 1966
Adolf Petit (1822–1914)
Andrea Beltrami (1870–1897)
Gaspar Bertoni (1777–1853)
Giovanna Francesca Michelotti (1843–1888)
Jean-Marie de Lamennais (1780–1860)
Vital-Justin Grandin (1829–1902)

1968

July 4, 1968
Carlo Domenico Albani (1790–1839)
Gabriel Rivat (1808–1881)
Johann Nepomuk von Tschiderer zu Gleifheim (1777–1860)
Maria Repetto (1807–1890)

September 19, 1968
Agostina Livia Pietrantoni (1864–1894)
Charles Schilling (1835–1907)

1969

January 30, 1969
Mary Frances Schervier (1819–1876)
Maximilian Kolbe (1894–1941)

1970

March 16, 1970
Joseph Freinademetz (1852–1908)
Mary Theresa Ledóchowska (1863–1922)
Miguel Febres Cordero (1854–1910)
Rafaela Ybarra de Vilallonga (1843–1900)

May 4, 1970
Clemente Marchisio (1833–1903)
Emmanuel Domingo y Sol (1836–1909)
Francisco Coll Guitart (1812–1875)
Mutien-Marie Wiaux (1841–1917)
Valentinus Paquay (1828–1905)

November 19, 1970
Eugène de Mazenod (1782–1861)
Charles Steeb (1773–1856)
María Juana Guillén (1575–1607)
Marie-Madeleine d'Houët (1781–1858)

1971

June 14, 1971
Ana Petra Pérez Florido (1845–1906)
Francesco Faà di Bruno (1825–1888)
Giuseppe Toniolo (1845–1918)
Ludovico Necchi Villa (1876–1930)

1972

June 22, 1972
Battista Vernazza (1497–1587)
Ceferino Namuncurá (1886–1905)
Giovanni Battista Jossa (1767–1828)
Jacques-Désiré Laval (1803–1864)
Jean Gailhac (1802–1890)
María López de Rivas Martínez (1560–1640)

1973

May 10, 1973
Arnold Janssen (1837–1909)
Giovanni Merlini (1795–1873)
Giuseppe Moscati (1880–1927)
Louis-Zéphirin Moreau (1824–1901)
Maria Teresa Zonfrilli (1899–1934)
Paula Delpuig Gelabert (1811–1889)
Vincenzo Grossi (1845–1917)

October 18, 1973
Bernard Mary of Jesus (1831–1911)
William Joseph Chaminade (1761–1850)

1974

January 21, 1974
Beatrice of Silva (1424–1492)

March 1, 1974
Leopold Mandić (1866–1942)

October 4, 1974
Gaetano Errico (1791–1860)
Maria Katharina Kasper (1820–1898)
Rosa Francisca Dolors Molas Vallvé (1815–1876)

1975

February 1, 1975
Andrea Carlo Ferrari (1850–1921)
Caterina Dominici (1829–1894)
Ezequiel Moreno y Díaz (1848–1906)

May 23, 1975
Ana de los Angeles Monteagudo (1602–1686)
Teresa Maria Manetti (1846–1910)

October 3, 1975
Bartolo Longo (1841–1926)
Matt Talbot (1856–1925)

1976

February 12, 1976
Alfonso Maria Fusco (1839–1910)
Angela of the Cross (1846–1932)

May 15, 1976
Enrique de Ossó y Cercelló (1840–1896)
Marie Amelie Fristel (1798–1866)

November 13, 1976
Joseph Gérard (1831–1914)
Louis-Édouard Cestac (1801–1868)

1977

January 20, 1977
Albert Chmielowski (1845–1916)

April 14, 1977
Maria Anna Sala (1829–1891)

July 7, 1977
Damien De Veuster (1840–1889)
Giorgio Maria Martinelli (1655–1727)
Maria Luisa Maurizi (1770–1831)
Pietro Domenico Trabattoni (1848–1930)

1978

February 6, 1978
Anna Maria Adorni Botti (1805–1893)
Claudine Thévenet (1774–1837)
Luigi Orione (1872–1940)
Mary Frances Sinclair (1900–1925)

June 12, 1978
André Bessette (1845–1937)
Joseph Marello (1844–1895)
Luigi Scrosoppi(1804–1884)
Riccardo Pampuri (1897–1930)

See also
 List of people declared venerable by Pope John XXIII
 List of people declared venerable by Pope John Paul II
 List of people declared venerable by Pope Benedict XVI
 List of people declared venerable by Pope Francis

External links
 Patron Saints Index

 
Venerable by Pope Paul VI